The Instrumentals  may refer to:
The Instrumentals (T-Pain album)
The Instrumentals: The Best of the Capitol Years, a compilation album by Leo Kottke
The Instrumentals: The Best of the Chrysalis Years, a compilation album by Leo Kottke

See also
Instrumental (disambiguation)